Final Set is a 2020 French sports drama film written and directed by Quentin Reynaud. It stars Alex Lutz as an aging tennis player who competes in the qualifying rounds of the French Open for one last attempt at glory. The film premiered at the 2020 Angoulême Film Festival. It was later released in France on 16 June 2021.

Premise 
Thomas Edison was once renowned as a young tennis prodigy, but never had the career he hoped for. At 37, despite his declining physical fitness and shattered knee he decides to compete in the intense qualifying rounds of the French Open at Roland-Garros for one last attempt at glory. Although his wife Eve and mother Judith advise him to give up, Thomas obsessively pushes forward. He will have to fight his own demons and will ultimately face a determined young player who reminds him of his younger self.

Cast 

 Alex Lutz as Thomas Edison
 Ana Girardot as Eve, Thomas's wife
 Kristin Scott Thomas as Judith Edison, Thomas's mother
 Jürgen Briand as Damien Thosso
 Tariq Bettahar as Marc
 Quentin Reynaud as JB
 Paul-Henri Mathieu as himself
 Lionel Chamoulaud as himself (commentator)
 Arnaud Boetsch as himself (commentator)

Production 
Final Set was writer-director Quentin Reynaud's second film following Paris-Willouby, released in 2015. Reynaud, himself a former tennis player, sought to create a tennis film with tennis at the forefront of the story. To this end, he became the first French director to be authorized to film on the Roland-Garros grounds, specifically Court 14. Alex Lutz had to undergo training to be able to achieve the realistic "posture" of a tennis player and worked extensively with Reynaud to achieve that. Prior to filming, Lutz claimed that he had the tennis skill of a "beach badminton" player, so he worked to create specific mannerisms on the court.

Jürgen Briand, who portrayed the young prodigy Damien Thosso, is himself a current French tennis player achieveing a career high ATP rating of 594.

Reception

Box office 
In France, the film earned $418,659, where it premiered for five weeks.

Critical response 
On the review aggregator website Rotten Tomatoes, 88% of eight critics' reviews are positive.

References

External links 
 

French sports drama films
2020 films
2020s sports drama films
2020s French films